al-Watiya Air Base also known as Okba Ibn Nafa Air Base  is a military airport in the Nuqat al Khams district of western Libya. It was named after Uqba ibn Nafi, the Islamic general who conquered North Africa.

2011 military intervention in Libya 

The al-Watiya air force base was one of the few that escaped total destruction during the NATO-led intervention in 2011 because in its 43 hardened aircraft shelters were stored almost exclusively decommissioned aircraft, so they were not deemed a threat to coalition forces. Just several munition depots located near the airbase and only three hardened aircraft shelters, one where the last operational pro-Gaddafi Mirage F-1BD trainer fighter jet was stationed, and two where the last two operational pro-Gaddafi Su-22M3 bombers were stationed were destroyed.

Second Civil War 

The biggest setback for the pro-GNA forces happened on 9 August 2014, when pro-LNA forces captured al-Watiya air force base, where 10 to 12 decommissioned Su-22 bombers, several Mi-25 combat attack helicopters and possibly up to 21 decommissioned Mirage F-1ED fighter jets, as well as all spare parts and weapons for Mirage F-1ED and Su-22 aircraft, were stored there—this defeat crippled the pro-GNA air forces, because now they lost their main source of spare parts for maintaining their Mirage F-1ED fighter jets.

It then became an important strategic foothold for forces loyal to eastern-based commander Khalifa Haftar. Using the captured equipment in al-Watiya air force base, pro-LNA forces started to bring back to active service several Su-22 bombers and Mirage F-1ED fighter jets in 2014 and 2015.

2019–20 Western Libya campaign 

In April 2019, Haftar's army launched an offensive to take Tripoli from the UN-backed Government of National Accord, during which Air Force planes loyal to the GNA attacked LNA positions.  On 8 April 2019, a series of airstrikes was carried out by both pro-LNA and pro-GNA air forces—pro-GNA fighter jets bombed on that day the pro-LNA al-Watiya air force base, and in response to that attack pro-LNA MiG-21 fighter jets launched from that same air force base successfully bombed the pro-GNA Mitiga International Airport in Tripoli, damaging it

On 24 April 2019, a Mirage F1 was lost near al-Watiya airbase, shot down by pro-LNA forces, while pro-GNA air forces were bombing the pro-LNA al-Watiya airbase—its pilot, reportedly an Ecuadorian mercenary, ejected safely and was captured by pro-LNA forces, according to pro-LNA sources. At first, pro-LNA sources claimed it was a pro-GNA Mirage F-1AD shot down after bombing the pro-LNA forces in that area. However, analysis by foreign experts revealed it to be actually a Mirage F1-AD serial number 402, and initially suggested it was previously in the possession of the pro-LNA air forces, and that it was shot down by its own pro-LNA anti-air defences. Serial number 402 was later shown to be operational; however, the LNA claim regarding the pilot of the plane and ejection seat remained unproven, and the plane was an F1AD, with the only Mirage F1 previously confirmed to be active in GNA service being an F1ED. Therefore, the original owner of the plane remains unclear. It was unknown whether that Mirage F-1AD that crashed at al-Watiya air force base on April 24 was shot down by pro-LNA forces, or whether it crashed due to technical problems while repelling the pro-GNA air force attack, but a consensus later emerged that (in the absence of an official refutation of the LNA's claim) the Mirage lost must have been a GNA plane.

On 19 June 2019, pro-GNA forces claimed that their fighter jets bombed pro-LNA Al Watiya air force base, destroying on the runway a pro-LNA Su-22 fighter bomber just as it was taking off, however this claims remain unconfirmed by independent sources.

On 16 April 2020, GNA forces besieged al-Watiya airbase. On 21 April, the LNA launched a counter-attack from al-Watiya air base, capturing the town of Al-Aqrabiya north of the air base.

On 5 May 2020, the GNA launched a new offensive to capture al-Watiya airbase. The GNA claimed to have successfully encircled the base and claimed two enemy Grad Rocket launch vehicles destroyed and various ammunition vehicles.

On 18 May 2020, it was captured by forces aligned with Libya's internationally recognised government after a sustained assault, in what could be their most significant advance for nearly a year. At the base, they captured a Pantsir-S1 TLAR belonging to the Libyan National Army with minor damages and was transported by the US forces to be examined.

On 4 July 2020, unidentified "foreign" warplanes targeted al-Watiya airbase, according to a spokesman for the GNA forces, Col. Mohamed Gnounou. The airstrikes are claimed (by social media users and unreliable Pro Russian LNA forces) to have injured some Turkish soldiers and destroyed air defence networks and an EW system, however satellite pictures surfaced immediately afterwards, showing only the missile batteries of a single set of MIM-23 Hawk missiles were hit (which are unmanned and remotely operated). The claims of a Koral EW system being hit were also refuted with physical proof after the social media based unverified claims surfaced, when analysts noted the Koral system generates visible interference in satellite imagery, however to that date including the morning before the attack occurred, there was no visual interference from the KORAL system proving there never was one in Al Watiya (this makes sense as per its own usage doctrine it is an offensive system with Limited range, it has no use being deployed outside of the lines of combat, the front lines by then were far away East of Tipoli. The doctrine and interference argument put forward by analysts was also backed up by the fact that at the same time, in the North of Libya the Koral was visibly active at the same time in Al Khoms Naval base which also puts it in range of front lines, where it is actually effective and makes an impact on the operations of the Russian controlled LNA. The same Pro Russia sources also claimed that after the strike the Turkish forces made a substantial withdrawal from the base - which again was disproved by satellite pictures and open source aircraft tracking data. Since the very limited attack, the runway has been extended and repaved on 3 separate occasions recorded by Satellite imagery. The Turkish military also included the airbase in their annual New Year commemoration video both in 2022, and 2023, showing they are not even hiding the fact that it is active. Open source aircraft tracking software shows and extensive air bridge operation flown between Turkey and Al Watiya is active since 2020. With 82 different flights from Turkish air force heavy lift A400M cargo flights landing on the base. Which explains why the Turkish forces there made improvements to the Runway to allow the large cargo aircraft to land there regularly as they have been. Furthermore, as analysts feared the strikes would be repeated due to the very limited impact and refusal of the Turkish troops to leave the base but instead expand it. However fears of a secondary attack were cast aside, when after the bombing, a large strike package of Turkish F16s and airborne refueling tankers conducted a direct flight across the Mediterranean completely visible on open source tracking radars with a vector directly for north eastern Libya. Many analysts began sharing the flight and tracking it course across the sea towards Libya with messeges that the Russian controlled General Haftar and his forces were about to be eliminated in retaliation however all fighting stopped on the front lines and LNA forces immediately began withdrawals to standoff ranges. The Turkish flights were then tracked returning to Turkey in the later hours. This show of force and the threat it represented was accepted as having completely removed any belief the pro Russian forces in Libya had of thinking it was safe to strike Turkish troops. This was compounded when a Turkish Perry class frigate off the coast of Libya was attributed (2x launches detected on the ground and recorded, as well as the confirmed downing of a Russian Wagner Mig fighter aircraft (the pilot uploaded a video to twitter speaking Russian after ejecting, saying a Turkish launch had downed his aircraft near Tripoli frontlines). Locals then recovered one of the 2x launched ESSM missiles completely proving the legitemacy of the Russian pilots claim. Between these incidents the Turkish troops cemented a reputation of fear in Libya and were never directly or intently targetted again. Building 3 more bases in Libya and running open air training camps for the goverments troops. They have not had any interference from the Russian Wagner forces, or from Haftars LNA forces supported by Russia, Egypt, France, UAE since then.

See also

Transport in Libya
List of airports in Libya

References

External links
 OurAirports - Okba ibn Nafa
 Okba Ibn Nafa
 AeroInside - Okba Ibn Nafa
 openAIPopenAIP - Okba Ibn Nafa
 OpenStreetMap - Okba ibn Nafa
 Flyaway Simulation

Airports in Libya
Military installations of Libya
Libyan Air Force bases